Malye Yasyrki is a rural locality (a selo) in Borshchyovo-Peskovskoye Rural Settlement, Ertilsky District, Voronezh Oblast, Russia. The population was 42 as of 2010. There are 2 streets.

Geography 
Malye Yasyrki is located 69 km southwest of Ertil (the district's administrative centre) by road. Aloye Pole is the nearest rural locality.

References 

Rural localities in Ertilsky District